Elizabeth Foster was a novelist.

Elizabeth Foster may also refer to:

Elizabeth Foster, a character in The Gathering
Liz Foster, a character in The Young and the Restless

See also